Bobo Chan Man-Woon is a former Hong Kong singer and model. She was also an actress in several film and TV-series.

Life and career
Bobo's first film role was in 1999's Tempting Heart. In 2001, she debut her first CD, titled Shine. Between 2003 and 2005, she joined TVB and was featured in four of their dramas before parting ways. In between 2005 and 2008, Bobo reduced her involvement with acting and focused on other projects until the infamous leak of Edison Chen's scandal photos affected her career.

Photo scandal

In January and February 2008, explicit photos were found online involving Chan and Edison Chen. Compromising pics of Bobo privately posing nude and performing fellatio for Edison were leaked over the internet. The scandal also involved Gillian Chung, Cecilia Cheung, and others. The photos badly affected Bobo's career and personal life: strong public scrutiny, cancellation of media contracts, ending all product endorsements in her image, and the end of her engagement. Bobo went into seclusion along with those involved in the photos for over a year in hopes to return when public scrutiny has lessened. She traveled to the US for a time to avoid the media storm to find some peace; unfortunately, even after a year, it remained in public consciousness.

Retirement
Eventually, Gillian, Cecilia, and Edison made a successful return to the entertainment industry, however, Bobo never returned. Bobo decided to leave the entertainment industry and focus on managing a crystal gem shop, Crystal Jamming, in the summer of 2009. In a small public ceremony with some entertainment friends and press upon the opening of her crystal boutique in the North Point district of Hong Kong, she made it clear she would be leaving the entertainment industry to start a more quiet existence to avoid causing further trouble to the people closest to her.

Discography 
 Shine (2001)
 Bounce (2002)
 Graceful (2002)
 BoBo Chan – Phase 1 The Retrospect (2003)
 Fantasia (2005)

Filmography 
 I Do (2000)
 Shadow (2001)
 Women from Mars (2002) [cameo]
 The Park (2003)
 It Had to Be You! (2005)
 Cocktail (2006)

Television series 
 Aqua Heroes (2003)
 Hearts Of Fencing (2002)
 Sunshine Heartbeat (2004)
 The Gâteau Affairs (2005)

References

External links 
 
 Bobo in pinkwork (sound & video) 
 Bobo Chan at HKMDB

1979 births
Living people
Cantopop singers
Hong Kong contraltos
21st-century Hong Kong women singers